Deborah Kenny is an American educator, author of Born to Rise and the founder and Chief Executive of Harlem Village Academies, a network of charter schools in Harlem, New York.

Background
Kenny started the Harlem Village Academies charter schools shortly after her husband died of leukemia in 2001 as the founding principal of the flagship Harlem Village Academy. Previously, Kenny served as Group President of Sesame Street Publishing, and as Vice President of Marketing and Business Development of Time Warner's Parenting Group. She is a former classroom teacher with expertise in youth leadership training and curriculum development. In starting the schools, Kenny was heavily influenced by Jack Welch's approach to leadership and accountability.

Education
Kenny holds a Ph.D. and M.A. from Teachers College, Columbia University in comparative international education, and a B.A. magna cum laude from the University of Pennsylvania.

Work with Harlem Village Academies
Kenny is Chief Executive Officer Of Harlem Village Academies, a network of charter schools in Harlem. She has described an overemphasis on "The program elements…things like curriculum and class size and school size and longer day" and believes that none of these program elements are nearly as important as the quality of teaching in the schools.  "If you had an amazing teacher who was passionate and given the freedom and support to teach well that was just 100 times more important than anything else," she stated.

Kenny believes that the emphasis on program elements is one of the main reasons it has been so hard to repeat the successes of good schools. "They were trying to replicate programs instead of trying to develop people." Instead, Kenny said, "I became obsessed with how to develop great teachers. You put all of your focus on finding great people, and you establish a culture that helps them constantly learn and grow and become better at what they do. You have to provide a community in the school that supports and respects teachers. And you have to give them the kind of freedom that allows their passion for teaching to flourish."

Some of the country's most powerful leaders in business, finance, media, and entertainment have become close with Kenny and involved with her work in Harlem, including Hugh Jackman, Barry Diller, Rupert Murdoch, Michael Bloomberg, Dick Parsons, John Legend, Jack Welch, Katie Couric, Leon Black, Steve Forbes, Jonathan Gray, and Edward Lewis. President George W. Bush visited the flagship Harlem Village Academy in 2007 calling it "a model of excellence."

Educational philosophy
Kenny's educational philosophy is built on her vision to create schools where she would be happy to send her own children. "I had five core things in mind for my kids, and that's what I want for our students. I wanted them to be wholesome in character. I wanted them to be compassionate and to see life as a responsibility to give something to the world. I wanted them to have a sophisticated intellect. I wanted them to be avid readers, the kind of person who always has trouble putting a book down. And I raised them to be independent thinkers, to lead reflective and meaningful lives".

Her strategy for how to achieve this vision  was presented in a Wall Street Journal article in 2010 called "A Teacher Quality Manifesto" in which she discusses workplace culture and how it impacts public education. In this, Kenny sets out her approach to creating workplace culture. She describes three components of culture: ownership, teamwork and learning that have been the key to elevating teacher quality at her schools, and she believes the only way to fundamentally change public education is to build a culture in schools that attracts talent, brings out passion and holds teachers accountable for results.

She has spoken out against an overemphasis on teacher evaluation. "The government is building a bureaucracy that used to be around compliance, I fear that we're now building a bureaucracy around evaluation. Instead we need … to think deeply about human motivation. How do you bring out in someone the desire and drive to do their best, to hold themselves accountable."

Kenny is a proponent of the charter model and has said in order to promote education reform we need to "charterize" the country: "What's really critical is the freedom that you get with the charter to do whatever it takes to make it work. The secret is not the processes or systems that come out of the freedom and accountability. So we truly need every school in the country to have those underlying conditions of freedom and accountability. And then you'll see people on fire in the classroom."

She coined the phrase "authentic accountability" and she believes that authentic accountability can only happen in schools that have employment at will. "How do you provide all that trust and collaboration that all teachers need and deserve? The only way is authentic accountability. It's not a top down bureaucracy, it's not a checklist. It's restoring humanity to the classroom by restoring human judgment to schools."

Kenny wrote the book Born to Rise about her life and the founding of the schools.

Awards and media
Kenny was selected and profiled by Bill Cosby in Oprah Winfrey's 2010 power list. She was also featured in Esquires annual Best & Brightest. She was honored as "Educator of the Year" at a presentation by New York City Schools Chancellor Joel Klein, and received the national "Educators who Perform" award at the Center for Education Reform gala in Washington, DC gala in Washington, DC.

Kenny is a frequent contributor to education reform discussion on MSNBC's Morning Joe with Joe Scarborough. In 2008 she was a panelist at the Allen and Company Sun Valley Conference.

CriticismStudent AttritionAccording to the Daily News, "An unusually high number of younger students either drop out or are held back. In school year 2003-04, the year the school opened, only 48 of 73 fifth graders made it to sixth grade. In school year 2006-07, 46 of 68 moved on; in 2007-08, just 40 of 76 fifth graders made it to sixth grade." However, most recent publicly available data shows that Kenny's schools are now a model for exemplary student attrition with only 12% from 2009-10 to 2010-11, compared to a 22% average for traditional public schools in Harlem (District 5).

The New York City Department of Education reported that in 2011, 100% of students at HVA Middle school passed the eighth grade math test. While some columnists criticize the fact that the cohort started out with 75 students, and only 44 students took the test, this is consistent with the average student attrition of the school district.Teacher Attrition'
The issue of teacher attrition has been debated, with some pointing to exemplary teacher satisfaction and others claiming high rates. In a Huffington Post blog, Leonie Haimson wrote that "...Harlem Village Academy has some of the highest teacher turnover rates in the city, according to the NY State report cards. One of her charters had annual attrition rates of 60% and 53%, for the two most recent years for which data is available; the other had teacher attrition rates of 71% and 42%." The reason for the inconsistency, according to the New York Charter Center, is that the data do not capture many key factors including how many teachers "left the classroom because they were promoted within the same charter school or network."

CEO salary

In 2008, Kenny was among the highest paid education executives in New York State.  Her salary of $442,807 was second only to Geoff Canada, CEO of Harlem Children's Zone. According to Edward Lewis, HVA Board chair, founder of Essence Communications, Kenny's salary comes entirely from privately raised funds. It is not funded by government revenue. By 2018, Kenny's salary had risen to $619,463 according to Harlem Village Academies' tax return filed with the Internal Revenue Service.

References

External links

Year of birth missing (living people)
Living people
People from Harlem
Teachers College, Columbia University alumni
University of Pennsylvania alumni
American women chief executives
American chief executives of education-related organizations
Educators from New York City
American women educators
21st-century American women